The 1st Annual Latin Grammy Awards were held in Los Angeles at the Staples Center on Wednesday, September 13, 2000. The big winners were Luis Miguel, Santana and Maná with 3 awards; Juan Luis Guerra, Shakira, Fito Páez and Emilio Estefan Jr. received 2 awards each.

Winners were chosen by voting members of the Latin Academy from a list of finalists. The inaugural ceremony was broadcast live on CBS that year and was seen in more than 100 countries across the world. The two-hour show was the first bilingual broadcast ever to air on network television during prime time.

History
On January 20, 2000, the Latin Academy of Recording Arts & Sciences announced that the inaugural Latin Grammy Awards were going to take place on September 15, 2000, in Los Angeles and the awards ceremony would be broadcast in the United States by CBS, which will also distribute it to other countries. Nominations in 40 categories were to be released in August 2000.

The list of nominees for the 1st Annual Latin Grammy Awards, slated for September 13, 2000 in Los Angeles, was unveiled on Friday, July 7, 2000, in a Miami ceremony hosted by Michael Greene, President of the National Academy of Recording Arts & Sciences.

Leading the chase for statuettes were Marc Anthony, Shakira and Fito Páez with five nominations each. Juan Luis Guerra, Carlos Vives, and Maná, garnered four nominations. Earning three nominations were Luis Miguel, along with La Ley. Ricky Martin earned for two nominations. Christina Aguilera, received a nod on the Latin side of the musical divide for the Spanish-language remake of "Genie in a Bottle" titled "Genio Atrapado". In addition to the awards, Emilio Estefan Jr. was honored as the Latin Academy's First Latin Recording Academy Person of the Year. That award was presented during a dinner on September 11, 2000, at the Beverly Hilton Hotel in Beverly Hills, California.
  
The awards were organized by the Latin Academy of Recording Arts & Sciences (LARAS), incorporated by NARAS in 1997. LARAS is a membership-based association of musicians, producers, engineers and other recording professionals. The list of final nominees revealed was a result of balloting by LARAS members.

Live telecast
The list of hosts for the first-ever Latin Grammy Awards, included Gloria Estefan, Antonio Banderas, Jimmy Smits, Andy García and Jennifer Lopez, who also was announced to perform her hit single "No Me Ames" with Marc Anthony, but Anthony (with six nominations that night) did not attend the show citing complications with his (then) wife's pregnancy.

Son By Four also were announced performing a duet with boy band 'N Sync, with some singing in Spanish by the American band.

The telecast kicked off with a tribute to the late Tito Puente featuring Ricky Martin, Celia Cruz, and Gloria Estefan. Performances throughout the show included Santana & Maná, 'N Sync & Son By Four, Christina Aguilera, Shakira, Miami Sound Machine and Alejandro Fernández.

The two-hour show was the first bilingual broadcast ever to air on network television during prime time. It was broadcast around the world, either simultaneously or live on tape.

Compilation album
On September 12, 2000, Sony Discos released the first "Latin Grammy Nominees CD" to coincide with the inaugural awards with nominees from three categories, Record of the Year, Best Female Pop Vocal Performance and Best Tropical Song, with a portion of the proceeds to support the Latin Academy Of Recording Arts and Sciences for community-outreach efforts. It was expected that various labels took turns releasing Latin Grammy sets each year.

Nominations and winners
The nominations were announced on July 7, 2000 and the winners were revealed on September 13, 2000, including Maná, Luis Miguel and Santana each grabbing three trophies at the event. Santana and Maná won Record of the Year for the track "Corazón Espinado" from Santana's album, Supernatural and the same track was honored for Rock Duo or Group with Vocal. Maná also won Best Pop Performance and Santana won Best Pop Instrumental. Amarte Es Un Placer, by Mexican pop singer Luis Miguel won Album of the Year, Best Pop Album and Best Male Pop Performance. Marc Anthony's "Dímelo" picked up Song of the Year, and at age 73, Ibrahim Ferrer won Best New Artist. Emilio Estefan Jr., who was up for six honors, won only two awards: Producer of the Year and the Music Video award for directing his wife Gloria's "No Me Dejes de Querer". Meanwhile, Carlos Vives, also with six nominees, went home with no trophies. Tito Puente won posthumously for Traditional Tropical Performance for the title track from his final album, Mambo Birdland. His son and daughter accepted the award on his behalf. Winners were chosen by voting members of the Latin Academy from a list of finalists. The ceremony was broadcast live on CBS and was seen in more than 100 countries across the world.

Awards
Winners are in bold text.

General
Record of the Year

Santana featuring Maná – "Corazón Espinado"
Marc Anthony – "Dímelo"
Rubén Blades – "Tiempos"
Ricky Martin – "Livin' la Vida Loca"
Carlos Vives – "Fruta Fresca"

Album of the Year

Luis Miguel – Amarte Es Un Placer
Juan Luis Guerra 440 – Ni Es Lo Mismo Ni Es Igual
Shakira – MTV Unplugged
Caetano Veloso – Livro
Carlos Vives – El Amor de Mi Tierra

Song of the Year

Marc Anthony, Robert Blades, Angie Chirino and Cory Rooney – "Dímelo" (Marc Anthony)
Juan Carlos Calderón – "O Tú o Ninguna" (Luis Miguel)
Fito Páez – "Al Lado del Camino"
Juan Luis Guerra – "El Niágara en Bicicleta"
Martin Madera – "Fruta Fresca" (Carlos Vives)

Best New Artist

Ibrahim Ferrer
Café Quijano
Amaury Gutiérrez
Fernando Osorio
Ivete Sangalo

Pop
Best Female Pop Vocal Performance

Shakira – "Ojos Así"
Christina Aguilera – "Genio Atrapado"
Zizi Possi – "Meu Erro"
Mercedes Sosa – "Al Despertar"
Jaci Velasquez – "Llegar a Ti"

Best Male Pop Vocal Performance

Luis Miguel – "Tu Mirada"
Marc Anthony – "Dímelo"
Alejandro Fernández – "Quiéreme"
Ricky Martin – "Bella"
Carlos Vives – "Fruta Fresca"

Best Pop Performance by a Duo or Group with Vocals

Maná – "Se Me Olvidó Otra Vez"
Ketama – "Miénteme"
Jennifer Lopez and Marc Anthony – "No Me Ames"
Só Pra Contrariar featuring Gloria Estefan – "Santo Santo"
Andreas Vollenweider and Milton Nascimento – "Cor Do Amor"

Best Pop Instrumental Performance

Santana – "El Farol"
Raúl di Blasio – "El Despertar Escandalo"
Ivan Lins – "Dois Córregos"
Frankie Marcos featuring Arturo Sandoval – "Oh Havana, When I Think Of You"
Nestor Torres – "Luna Latina"

Best Pop Vocal Album

Luis Miguel – Amarte Es Un Placer
Ketama – Toma Ketama!
Maná – MTV Unplugged
Pablo Milanés – Vengo Naciendo
Shakira – MTV Unplugged

Rock
Best Female Rock Vocal Performance
Shakira – "Octavo Día"
Erica Garcia – "Vete Destino"
Alejandra Guzmán – "Algo Natural"
Rosario – "Jugar A La Locura"
Cecilia Toussaint – "Como La Nada"

Best Male Rock Vocal Performance
Fito Páez – "Al Lado del Camino"
Enrique Bunbury – "El Extranjero"
Andrés Calamaro – "Te Quiero Igual"
Gustavo Cerati – "Bocanada"
Charly García – "Sweet Home Buenos Aires"

Best Rock Performance by a Duo/Group with Vocals
Santana featuring Maná – "Corazón Espinado"
Jarabe de Palo – "Depende"
Los Fabulosos Cadillacs – "La Vida"
Jaguares – "Fín"
La Ley – "Aquí"

Best Rock Song
Fito Páez – "Al Lado del Camino"
Beto Cuevas and Aldo Nova – "Aquí" (La Ley)
Saúl Hernández – "Fín" (Jaguares)
Gustavo Cerati – "Puente"
Fermin Caballero, Raul Chapa and Jason Roberts – "Si Señor" (Control Machete)

Best Rock Album
Café Tacuba – Revés/Yo Soy
Jaguares – Bajo el Azul de Tu Misterio
Illya Kuryaki and the Valderramas – Leche
La Ley – Uno
Fito Páez – Abre

Tropical
Best Salsa Album
Celia Cruz – Celia Cruz and Friends: A Night of Salsa
Oscar D'León – La Formula Original
Los Van Van – Llegó . . . Van Van: Van Van Is Here
Gilberto Santa Rosa – Expresión
Son By Four – Son By Four

Best Merengue Album
Juan Luis Guerra 440 – Ni Es Lo Mismo Ni Es Igual
Elvis Crespo – Píntame
Grupo Manía – Masters Of The Stage
Hermanos Rosario – Bomba 2000
Olga Tañón – Olga Viva, Viva Olga

Best Traditional Tropical Album
Tito Puente – Mambo Birdland
Joe Arroyo – En Sol Mayor
Cachao – Cuba Linda
Ibrahim Ferrer – Buena Vista Social Club Presents Ibrahim Ferrer
Carlos Vives – El Amor De Mi Tierra

Best Tropical Song
Juan Luis Guerra – "El Niágara en Bicicleta"
Omar Alfanno – "A Puro Dolor" (Son By Four)
Emilio Estefan Jr. and Kike Santander – "Da La Vuelta" (Marc Anthony)
Martin Madera – "Fruta Fresca" (Carlos Vives)
Robert Blades, Emilio Estefan Jr. and Gloria Estefan – "No Me Dejes de Querer" (Gloria Estefan)

Regional
Best Ranchero Album
Alejandro Fernández – Mi Verdad
Antonio Aguilar – Consentida
Pepe Aguilar – Por mujeres como tú
Vicente Fernández – Vicente Fernández y los más grandes éxitos de los Dandy's
Nydia Rojas – Si me conocieras

Best Banda Album
Banda el Recodo – Lo Mejor De Mi Vida
Banda Arkángel R-15 – Esperando un ángel
Banda Machos – Rancheras de oro
Banda Maguey – Mil Gracias
Graciela Beltrán – La reina del pueblo con banda
Joan Sebastian – El rey del jaripeo

Best Grupero Album
Los Temerarios – En La Madrugada se Fue
Ana Bárbara – Tu Decisión
Conjunto Primavera – Morir de Amor
Guardianes del amor – Un pedazo de luna
La Mafia – Momentos

Best Tejano Album
Los Palominos – Por Eso Te Amo
David Lee Garza & Los Musicales – Nadie como yo
Stefani Montiel – Dulce sensación
Bobby Pulido – El Cazador
A.B. Quintanilla & Los Kumbia Kings – Amor, Familia Y Respeto

Best Norteño Album
Los Tigres del Norte – Herencia de Familia
Grupo Atrapado – ¡Oh! que gusto
Intocable – Contigo
Los Tucanes de Tijuana – Al por mayor
Cornelio Reyna Jr. featuring Ramón Ayala y Sus Bravos Del Norte – La leyenda continúa...

Best Regional Song
Kike Santander – "Mi Verdad" (Alejandro Fernández)
Ricardo Ceratto – "Me Estoy Acostumbrando a Tí" (Pepe Aguilar)
Massias – "Loco" (Alejandro Fernández)
Juan Carlos Medrano – "El Carretonero"' (Los Rieleros del Norte)
Edel Ramírez – "No Debes Llorar" (Los Cosmos)

Traditional
Best Folk Album
Mercedes Sosa – Misa Criolla
Hevia – Tierra de nadie
Los Nocheros – Nocheros
Carlos Núñez – Os amores libres
Totó la Momposina – Pacantó

Best Tango Album
Lito Vitale and Juan Carlos Baglietto – Postales del Alma
Nestor Marconi – Trío Bien de arriba
Rodolfo Mederos – Eterno Buenos Aires
Nuevo Quinteto Real – Nuevo Quinteto Real
Quinteto Argentino de Cuerdas – Tangos de terciopelo

Best Flamenco Album
Camarón and Tomatito – Paris 87
Remedios Amaya – Gitana Soy
Juan Habichuela – De la zambra al duende... un homenaje
El Lebrijano – Lágrimas de cera
Miguel Poveda – Suena Flamenco

Jazz
Best Jazz Album
Michel Camilo and Tomatito – Spain
Paquito D'Rivera – Tropicana Nights
Adrian Iaies Trio – Las Tardecitas de Minton's
Chico O'Farrill – Heart of a Legend
Lalo Schifrin – Latin Jazz Suite

Brazilian
Best Brazilian Contemporary Pop Album
Milton Nascimento – Crooner
Zeca Baleiro – Vo Imbola
Ana Carolina – Ana Carolina
Zizi Possi – Puro Prazer
Ivete Sangalo – Ivete Sangalo

Best Brazilian Rock Album
Os Paralamas do Sucesso – Acústico MTV
Cássia Eller – Com Vocé... Meu Mundo Ficaria Completo
Legião Urbana – Acústico MTV
Los Hermanos – Los Hermanos
Raimundos – Só no Forevis

Best Samba/Pagode Album
Zeca Pagodinho – Zeca Pagodinho ao Vivo
Alcione – Claridade
Martinho da Vila – Lusofonia
Velha Guarda da Portela – Tudo Azul
Velha Guarda da Mangueira – Velha Guarda da Mangueira e Convidados

Best MPB Album
Caetano Veloso – Livro
Maria Bethânia – A Forca Que Nunca Seca
Gilberto Gil – O Sol de Oslo
Joyce – Astronauta - Cancões de Elis
Lenine – Na Pressão

Best Sertaneja Music Album
Sérgio Reis – Sérgio Reis e Convidados
Zezé di Camargo & Luciano – Zezé di Camargo y Luciano
Leonardo – Tempo
Roberta Miranda – Ao Vivo - A Majestade o Sabiá
Wilson & Soraya – Nada Foi em Vão

Best Brazilian Roots/Regional Album
Paulo Moura & Os Batutas – Pixinguinha
Nilson Chaves – Tempo Destino: 25 Anos ao Vivo
Dominguinhos – Voce Vai Ver o Que é Bom
Toninho Ferragutti – Sanfonemas
Carlos Malta and Pife Muderno – Carlos Malta e Pife Muderno

Best Brazilian Song
Djavan – "Acelerou"
Chico César and Vanessa da Mata – "A Forca Que Nunca Seca" (Maria Bethânia)
Marcelo Camelo – "Anna Julia" (Los Hermanos)
Nando Reis – "O Segundo Sol" (Cássia Eller)
Cristovão Bastos and Aldir Blanc – "Suave Veneno" (Nana Caymmi)

Children's
Best Children's Album
Miliki – A Mis Niños de 30 Años
Daniela Luján – El diario de Daniela
Various Artists – Ellas cantan a cri cri
Maria del Rey – Lullabies of Latin America: canciones de cuna de Latinoamérica
Eliana – Primavera

Classical
Best Classical Album
Plácido Domingo – La Dolores
Aldo Antognazzi, Paquito D'Rivera and Brenda Feliciano – Música de dos Mundos
José María Vitier – Salmo de las Américas
Esa-Pekka Salonen – Sensamayá: The Music of Silvestre Revueltas
Eduardo Diazmuñoz and La Filarmonica de la Ciudad de Mexico – Twentieth Century Mexican Symphonic Music, Vol. 1

Production
Best Engineered Album
Carlos Álvarez, Mike Couzzi, Bolívar Gómez, Miguel Hernández, Luis Mansilla, Carlos Ordehl, Eric Ramos, July Ruiz, and Eric Schilling –  Ni Es Lo Mismo Ni Es Igual (Juan Luis Guerra)
Frank Filipetti – Abre (Fito Páez)
Jerry Boys – Buena Vista Social Club Presents Ibrahim Ferrer (Ibrahim Ferrer)
Moogie Canazio – João Gilberto Voz e Violão (João Gilberto)
Joe Chiccarelli – Revés/Yo Soy (Café Tacuba)

Producer of the Year
Emilio Estefan Jr.
Ry Cooder
Rudy Pérez
KC Porter
Caetano Veloso

Music Video
Best Music Video
Gloria Estefan – "No Me Dejes de Querer"
Los Fabulosos Cadillacs – "La Vida"
La Ley – "Aquí"
Jennifer Lopez and Marc Anthony – "No Me Ames"
Shakira – "Ojos Así"

References

2000 music awards
Latin Grammy Awards by year
2000 in Latin music
2000 in Los Angeles
September 2000 events in the United States